Megafauna is a hard rock band from Austin, Texas. Founded by singer/guitarist Dani Neff in 2008, the band also consists of Zack Humphrey on drums and Will Krause on bass. Their third album Maximalist was released in April 2014. Their latest album, Ghost Coast, was released in May 2019.

Discography

Albums

 Larger Than Human (2010)
 Surreal Estate (2012)
 Maximalist (2014)
 Welcome Home (2016)
 Ghost Coast

Singles
 "Touch the Lion" (2012)
 "Time To Go" (2014)
 "Haunted Factory" (2014)
 "Precious Blood" (2014)

Band members
Dani Neff – vocals, guitar (2008–present)
Zack Humphrey – drums (2012–present)
Will Krause – bass (2008–2011, 2015–present)
Winston Barrett – guitar, keyboards (2016–present)

Former members
Cameron Page – drums (2008–2011)
Greg Yancey – bass (2012–2014)
Bryan Wright – bass (2014–2015)
John Musci – rhythm guitar, bass (2013–2014)

References

External links

 Official Website

Musical groups established in 2008
Musical groups from Austin, Texas
2008 establishments in Texas